Cameron Smyth (born August 19, 1971) is a Republican politician who served in the California State Assembly. He succeeded Keith Richman who was term-limited.

Prior to being elected to the state legislature, Smyth served on the Santa Clarita City Council, where he was first elected in 2000 and re-elected in 2004. During his time on the council, Smyth twice served as mayor, first in 2003 and again in 2005.

Background
Born in Pasadena and raised in Santa Clarita, Smyth attended local public schools and earned his B.A. in Rhetoric and Communications from the University of California, Davis, where he was also a two-sport athlete.

Political background
Smyth began his career as a Field Representative for the California Republican Party. In 1994 he was hired by the late State Assemblyman William "Pete" Knight. In 1996, Smyth served as campaign manager for Knight's successful State Senate campaign.  Other than Garrett Biggs, who served as on-site manager for the late Assemblyman Nao Takasugi's successful re-election campaign, Smyth was the youngest on-site manager for any state legislative race in California at that time.

Upon winning the election, Knight promoted Smyth to the position of Deputy Chief of Staff. In 2000, Smyth moved to the private sector to operate his own consulting business.

Personal
Smyth and his wife Lena are the parents of two sons.

References

Cameron Smyth —  State Assembly Member

Republican Party members of the California State Assembly
1971 births
Living people
California city council members
Mayors of places in California
People from Santa Clarita, California
University of California, Davis alumni
21st-century American politicians